Cyril Lello (1921–1997) was an English professional footballer who played for Shrewsbury Town, Everton, Rochdale and Runcorn.

Born in Ludlow, Shropshire, he had played at amateur level for Ludlow Town and Hereford United before turning professional when he joined Shrewsbury Town in 1939. He made guest appearances for various clubs during the time of the Second World War, then signed for Everton in 1946. He set a record 155 consecutive appearances for the club. He transferred to Rochdale in 1956.

In retirement after playing for Runcorn, he ran an electrical goods shop and ran youth club football sides for several years.

References

Article on Cyril Lello in the Ludlow Advertiser

1921 births
1997 deaths
English footballers
English Football League players
Association football defenders
Shrewsbury Town F.C. players
Everton F.C. players
Rochdale A.F.C. players